Bianca Froese-Acquaye is an artist, author and painter.  She is the manager of the band Tangerine Dream.

In 2002 she married Tangerine Dream founder Edgar Froese, they remained married until his death in 2015.

She performed vocals on the 2002 Tangerine Dream album Inferno.

She is the co-author of Edgar Froese's autobiography Force Majeure. Bianca Froese-Acquaye co-produced the TV-documentary Tangerine Dream: Sound from Another World and the longer cine version Revolution of Sound: Tangerine Dream, directed by Margarete Kreuzer.

The 2014 Grand Theft Auto V soundtrack album The Cinematographic Score — GTA 5 was composed and produced by Edgar Froese, while Bianca Froese-Acquaye provided the cover art and acted as executive producer.

Personal life
Froese-Acquaye is of mixed German and Ghanaian descent.

References

External links

1964 births
Living people
German documentary film producers
German women painters
German record producers
German people of Ghanaian descent
German electronic musicians
German women writers
21st-century German women artists
German women record producers
Women documentary filmmakers